Harry B. Higginbotham (27 July 1894 – 3 June 1950) was a professional footballer who played mainly as an inside forward.

Career
Born in New South Wales, Australia, Higginbotham emigrated to Scotland with his family in 1900, initially living in the Edinburgh area before moving to Glasgow. He represented Scotland at junior international level while playing for Kilsyth Rangers, then signed for St Mirren in 1916. After playing regularly as an outside right for the Buddies for two seasons during World War I (the Scottish Football League continued during the conflict for morale reasons) he made no appearances in a third campaign despite still being contracted to the Paisley club; this was possibly related to wartime commitments elsewhere, and he made guest appearances for several clubs including Hibernian and Third Lanark in Scotland and Fulham and Millwall in London.

In 1919 Higginbotham joined Football League Second Division side South Shields. He made seven league appearances for the club before moving to Luton Town the following year. He spent three seasons with the Bedfordshire club, scoring 25 goals in 80 league games. In February 1923, Higginbotham signed for Clapton Orient and went on to score once in 19 appearances for the team.

A year later, in February 1924, Higginbotham was signed by Nelson as the team battled to avoid relegation from the Second Division. He made his debut on 23 February 1924 in a 2–0 defeat away at Bury. Higginbotham went on to make three more league appearances for Nelson, including a 1–0 win against Manchester United at Old Trafford on 8 March. He left at the end of the 1923–24 season and subsequently joined Reading. During a single season with the Royals, he played 24 league matches and scored three goals. Higginbotham then had spells in Welsh football with Mid Rhondda and Pontypridd before returning to Scotland.

References

1894 births
1950 deaths
Soccer players from Sydney
Footballers from Glasgow
People from Springburn
Scottish footballers
Australian soccer players
Association football forwards
South Shields F.C. (1889) players
Luton Town F.C. players
Leyton Orient F.C. players
Nelson F.C. players
Reading F.C. players
Mid Rhondda F.C. players
Pontypridd F.C. players
Scottish Junior Football Association players
Scotland junior international footballers
St Mirren F.C. players
Kilsyth Rangers F.C. players
Scottish Football League players
English Football League players
Fulham F.C. wartime guest players
Millwall F.C. wartime guest players
Australian emigrants to Scotland